Hillary Ikdondo (born 31 March 1997) is a Congolese handball player for Real Madrid and the DR Congo national team.

She represented DR Congo at the 2019 World Women's Handball Championship.

References

1997 births
Living people
Democratic Republic of the Congo female handball players
Expatriate handball players
Democratic Republic of the Congo expatriate sportspeople in Spain
21st-century Democratic Republic of the Congo people